Strymon mulucha is a butterfly of the family Lycaenidae. It was described by William Chapman Hewitson in 1867. It is found in Guatemala, Costa Rica, the Amazon region of Brazil, Venezuela and Colombia.

References

 "Species Strymon mulucha". Butterflies of America. With images.

Butterflies described in 1867
Mulucha
Butterflies of Central America
Lycaenidae of South America
Taxa named by William Chapman Hewitson